Turricula amplisulcus is a species of sea snail, a marine gastropod mollusk in the family Clavatulidae.

Description

Distribution
This marine species occurs along Table Bay and Agulhas Bank, South Africa

References

 Barnard K.H. (1958), Contribution to the knowledge of South African marine Mollusca. Part 1. Gastropoda; Prosobranchiata: Toxoglossa; Annals of The South African Museum v. 44 p. 73–163

External links
 

Endemic fauna of South Africa
amplisulcus
Gastropods described in 1958